The Merrill Avenue Historic District in Glendive, Montana is a historic district which was listed on the National Register of Historic Places in 1988. It includes Classical Revival, Late Gothic Revival, and Italianate architecture.

History
The district includes several works by architect Brynjulf Rivenes:
Glendive City Hall, 300 S Merrill Avenue (1914) 
Douglas & Mead Building, 119-121 N Merrill Avenue (1915 remodeling),
Krug Building, 202 South Merrill Avenue (ca. 1908) 
Rivenes-Wester Building,  206 South Merrill Avenue (1905) 
First National Bank Building   200 South Kendrick (1903)
Dion Brothers Building, 106-108 South Merrill Avenue (1910s remodeling)

The district's buildings were associated with a number of notable residents including Charles Krug, Henry Dion, J. H. Miskimen, Frank Kinney, A. S. Foss, Henry Douglas, David Mead, G. D. Hollecker, W. F. Jordan, C. A. Thurston, and Thomas Hogan.

Gallery

References

Other sources
Guide to Historic Glendive'' (Montana Historical Society. 1998)

External links
Montana Main Street Program

Historic districts on the National Register of Historic Places in Montana
Italianate architecture in Montana
Neoclassical architecture in Montana
Gothic Revival architecture in Montana
National Register of Historic Places in Dawson County, Montana